The Gambler is a 2019 Indian Malayalam-language comedy-drama film directed by Tom Emmatty (who directed Oru Mexican Aparatha) and starring Anson Paul and George Emmatty (director's son). The film is about a father, George, who appears in his son's dreams as a superhero, IO Man. The film was touted to be the first Malayalam superhero film.

Plot

Cast 
Anson Paul as Anson
 George Emmatty
Dayyana Hameed
Innocent
Salim Kumar
Vijayakumar
Vishnu Govindan
Sijoy Varghese
 Roopesh Peethambaran
Joseph Annamkutty Jose
Jayaraj Warrier
 Aristo Suresh
Rajini Chandy
Sreelakshmy Ramshy
 Vidya Martin

Release and reception 
The film released on 9 May.

A critic from The Times of India gave 2/5 and wrote that "The film could sure have made a better impact if the treatment was well-thought-out". A critic from The New Indian Express gave a negative review. A critic from Deccan Chronicle opined that "At this time when Avengers Endgame is still going strong in the theatres, it would be an eye-opener for the director to watch what a superhero film actually entails".

References

External links 
 

2019 films
2010s Malayalam-language films
2010s superhero films
Indian superhero films